Prince Gustav of Denmark (Christian Frederik Vilhelm Valdemar Gustav; 4 March 1887 – 5 October 1944) was a member of the Danish royal family. He was the fourth and youngest son and seventh child of King Frederick VIII and Queen Louise.

Early life 

Prince Gustav was born on 4 March 1887 at his parents' country residence, the Charlottenlund Palace north of Copenhagen, during the reign of his paternal grandfather, King Christian IX. He was the seventh child and fourth son of Crown Prince Frederick of Denmark and his wife Louise of Sweden. His father was the eldest son of King Christian IX and Louise of Hesse-Kassel, and his mother was the only daughter of King Charles XV of Sweden and Norway and Louise of the Netherlands. He was baptised with the names Christian Frederik Wilhelm Valdemar Gustav, and was known as Prince Gustav.

Prince Gustav was raised with his siblings in the royal household in Denmark and grew up between his parents' residence in Copenhagen, the Frederick VIII's Palace at the Amalienborg Palace complex, and their country retreat, the Charlottenlund Palace, located by the coastline of the Øresund strait north of the city.

Prince Gustav remained unmarried and had no children.

Later life 
On 2 February 1935 in the Russian Orthodox Church in Copenhagen he was, together with his cousin Grand Duchess Olga Alexandrovna of Russia and her husband colonel Nikolai Kulikovsky, a godparent at the christening of Aleksander Schalburg, son of first lieutenant in the Royal Danish Life Guards Christian Frederik von Schalburg.

Prince Gustav died on 5 October 1944 at his estate Egelund House north of Copenhagen in North Zealand, Denmark.

Title, style and honours

Title and style
4 March 1887 – 5 October 1944: His Royal Highness Prince Gustav of Denmark

Honours

Ancestry

References

Citations

Bibliography

 

1887 births
1944 deaths
House of Glücksburg (Denmark)
Danish princes
Sons of kings
Recipients of the Cross of Honour of the Order of the Dannebrog
Grand Croix of the Légion d'honneur
Prince Gustav of Denmark
Honorary Knights Grand Cross of the Royal Victorian Order
Burials at Roskilde Cathedral